Josep María Castellví Marimón (1900 in Barcelona – 1944 in Barcelona) was a Catalan film director. He made one of the first sound shorts, Cinópolis in France in 1931.

Filmography
1931 Cinópolis (France)
1932 Mercedes (film), - notable as the first Spanish "talkie" musical film
1934 ¡Viva la vida!. Comedy with José Santpere, Rosita Ballesteros, Conchita Ballesteros, Consuelo Cuevas, and Alady (Carles Saldaña Beut)
1940 Romeo and Juliet
1942 Cuarenta y ocho horas 
1943 El camino del amor 
1944 El hombre que las enamora

References

1900 births
1944 deaths